Kalavashk (also Romanized as Kalāvashk) is a village in Khavashod Rural District, Rud Ab District, Sabzevar County, Razavi Khorasan Province, Iran. At the 2006 census, its population was 124, in 32 families.

References 

Populated places in Sabzevar County